Măeriște is a commune located in Sălaj County, Crișana, Romania.

Geography

The commune, with an area of 74.97 km2 (7,500 ha), is in the north-west part of the county, in the hydrographic basin of the river Crasna. It is composed of six villages: Criștelec (Kerestelek), Doh (Doh), Giurtelecu Șimleului (Somlyógyőrtelek), Măeriște (located at 43 km from Zalău), Mălădia (Maladé) and Uileacu Șimleului (Somlyóújlak).

Tourism

Among the commune's tourist sites are the Reformed Church, Uileacu Șimleului (a former Benedictine monastery), an architectural monument dated from 1260 to 1300, as well as other churches.

The Doh church dates to 1869. The church in Mălădia was completed in 1908.

It is 21 km from the projected Transylvania Motorway.

Population

According to the 2011 Romanian census, the commune had 3,037 inhabitants. According to the 2002 Romanian Census, the commune population is 3,762, of which 87.78% are Romanians, 11.24% Hungarians, 0.79% Roms, 0.11% Slovaks and 0.08% other nationalities.

Economy

The economy of the commune is mainly agricultural, based on cereal, potato and vegetable growing. In the last few years livestock-breeding has developed.

History
Măeriște was first mentioned in 1351 under the name Hydveg.  The other settlements were mentioned a little earlier (Criștelec - 1257, Doh - 1338, Giurtelecu Șimleului - 1259, Mălădia - 1259 and Uileacu Șimleului - 1240).

It was a part of Kraszna County and then Szilágy County.

According to the database of Lo Tishkach European Jewish Cemeteries Initiative, there are Jewish cemeteries in Criștelec, Doh, Giurtelecu Șimleului, Măeriște, and Uileacu Șimleului.

Politics 

The mayor Vasile Lazăr was elected for the first time in 2004 as member of the Democratic Liberal Party and re-elected in 2008, 2012, 2016 and 2020.

2012 election 

Monica Oțelia Pușcaș resigned from the position of secretary of the town hall on March 28, 2012, to run for the mayor's seat as a candidate of the Social Liberal Union in the local election. Monica-Oțelia Pușcaș had worked for the town hall for 30 years (of which the last 18 years she had served as the secretary of the town hall).

The Măeriște Council, elected in the 2012 local government election, is made up of 13 councilors, with the following party composition: 9-Democratic Liberal Party, 3-Social Liberal Union, 1-Democratic Alliance of Hungarians in Romania.

2008 election 

The mayor Vasile Lazăr was elected with 70.37% in the first round of election; Alexa Avram (PNL) - 22.73%, Vasile Mitrașca (PSD) - 6.89%. The Măeriște Council, elected in the 2008 local election, was made up of 13 councilors, with the following party composition: 8-Democratic Party, 3-National Liberal Party, 1-Democratic Alliance of Hungarians in Romania, 1-Social Democratic Party.

2004 election 

The mayor Vasile Lazăr was elected for the first time. The Măeriște Council, elected in the 2004 local election, was made up of 13 councilors, with the following party composition: 5-Democratic Party, 2-National Liberal Party, 1-Democratic Alliance of Hungarians in Romania, 2-Social Democratic Party, 2-New Generation Party – Christian Democratic and 1-Romanian Humanist Party.

Gallery

See also
Wooden Church, Criștelec, built 1785

References

External links 
 Comuna Măeriște 
 Biserica de lemn din Criștelec

Communes in Sălaj County
1351 establishments in Europe
Shtetls
Jewish Hungarian history
Jewish Romanian history
14th-century establishments in Romania
Localities in Crișana